Hridhayathinte Nirangal is a 1979 Indian Malayalam-language film, directed and produced by P. Subramaniam and starring Madhu, Thikkurissy Sukumaran Nair, Raghavan and Unnimary. The film has a musical score by G. Devarajan and R. Sudarsanam. The film was a remake of the Tamil film Naanum Oru Penn.

Cast
Madhu
Thikkurissy Sukumaran Nair
Raghavan
Unnimary
Jayaprabha
Mallika Sukumaran

Soundtrack
The music was composed by G. Devarajan and R Sudarsanam and the lyrics were written by Sreekumaran Thampi.

References

External links
 

1979 films
1970s Malayalam-language films
Malayalam remakes of Tamil films
Films directed by P. Subramaniam
Films scored by R. Sudarsanam
Films scored by G. Devarajan